The Synod of Ráth Breasail (also known as Rathbreasail) (Irish: Sionad Ráth Bhreasail) was an Irish Catholic church council which took place in Ireland in 1111. It marked the transition of the Irish church from a monastic to a diocesan and parish-based church. Many Irish present-day dioceses trace their boundaries to decisions made at the synod.

Background
Viking raids on Ireland began around the start of the 9th century, and had a devastating effect on the Irish church. These disruptions, along with secular impositions by the invaders, produced a decline in Christian religious observance and the moral standards established by Saint Patrick and other early missionaries. Apathy towards these Christian virtues increased, causing many parts of Ireland to return to paganism by the 11th century, weakening Christianity's grasp on the populace.

Gradually, as the onslaughts of the Danes became less frequent, there was a revival of religious education which prepared the way for the religious reforms of the 12th century.

History
It was the second of four great reforming Irish synods; the other three were at Cashel (1101 and 1172), and Kells-Mellifont (1152). Rathbreasail is near Mountrath, County Laois, a suitably central place for such an important meeting, however, the location of the synod is not certain and sites in counties Armagh, Laois, Tipperary and Cork have been suggested as possible locations.  Ó Murchada (1999) argues in favour of a location near the townland of Clonbrassil about 4 miles southwest of Templemore, Co. Tipperary in the present-day parish of Drom & Inch.

It was convened by the papal legate, Gille, Bishop of Limerick. Gille is not mentioned in the Irish Annals, possibly because Limerick was then a Hiberno-Norse city. Its purpose was the Romanising of the Irish Church, and, in particular, the establishment of diocesan episcopacy.

The synod was attended by no fewer than fifty bishops, three hundred priests and three thousand laymen, including King Murtough O'Brien. There were no representatives of the provinces of Connaught and Leinster, in which the Reform movement had not yet established itself. The synod's deliberations were prompted by the Gregorian Reform and guided by the relatively new powers of the Papacy as defined in Dictatus papae (1075–87) and Libertas ecclesiae (1079).

The Council established two provinces: Armagh and Cashel. Each province consisted of twelve territorial dioceses. The boundaries of the dioceses were only vaguely defined, however. The synod also made the See of Waterford a suffragan of the Archbishop of Cashel having previously been a Danish city subject to Canterbury.

Dioceses established 

The following 24 dioceses were established by the synod:
 Armagh
 Cashel
 Ardagh: East Connacht
 Ardstraw: territory of the Cenél nEógain (excluding Inishowen)
 Clogher: Approximating to Kingdom of Uí Chremthainn
 Clonard: West Meath †
 Clonfert: Territory of the Uí Maine
 Connor: Territory of the Dál nAraidi
 Cong was named as one of the five dioceses for Connacht, but no names of bishops have been recorded.
 Cork
 Down: Territory of the Dál Fiatach
 Duleek: East Meath - At the Synod of Uisneach, convened by the abbot of Clonmacnoise later in 1111, the See of Duleek was suppressed. West Meath was assigned to a new Diocese of Clonmacnoise and East Meath to Clonard. It appears, however, that a number of bishops of Duleek were appointed before 1160.
 Elphin: East Connacht
 Emly
 Ferns or Loch Garman (Wexford Haven)
 Glendalough
 Kildare
 Kilkenny (subsequently renamed Ossory): Territory of Osraige
 Killala: Territory of the Uí Fiachrach Muaidhe
 Killaloe: Territory of Uí Fiachrach Aidhne
 Leighlin: One of five dioceses for Leinster
 Limerick
 Raphoe: Tír Conaill and Inis Eogain
 Ratass: Territories of the Ciarraighe, Corco Duibne and Eóganacht Locha Léin (moved to Ardfert by 1117)
 Tuam: One of five dioceses in Connacht
 Diocese of Waterford: already in existence, but had been subject to the Archdiocese of Canterbury prior to 1111

The Diocese of Dublin acknowledged the jurisdiction of Canterbury until 1096, but was not included in the list of dioceses at the synod. It was not incorporated into the system of Irish dioceses until the Synod of Kells in 1152.

See also
 Gregorian Reform

Notes

References
 Peter Galloway, The Cathedrals of Ireland, Belfast 1992
 Geoffrey Keating. Foras Feasa Book I-II Geoffrey Keating. http://www.ucc.ie/celt/published/G100054/text089.html The History of Ireland http://www.ucc.ie/celt/published/T100054/text090.html
 MacErlean, John (1914) Synod of Raith Breasail: Boundaries of the Dioceses of Ireland [A.D. 1110 or 1118]. Archivium Hibernicum, Vol. 3 (1914), pp. 1–33

External links
 The Dioceses of Ireland, Territorial History (Rootsweb)
 Wexford Placename Project

1111 in Ireland
Christianity in medieval Ireland
Rathbreasail
Ráth Breasail